Saga, the first studio album by the Canadian progressive rock band Saga, was originally released 8 April 1978. It is the band's only album to feature original keyboardist Peter Rochon.

Live performances

True to the album's legendary status among fans, there are few Saga concerts without material from the debut. "Humble Stance" is a fan favourite and a mainstay of the band's setlists. The song features on all the band's official live releases. "How Long", "Tired World (Chapter Six)", "Perfectionist" and "Ice Nice" are also frequently played live.
 "How Long" appears on In Transit (1982), Detours (rec. 1997, rel. 1999) and Worlds Apart Revisited (rec. 2005, rel. 2007).
 "Tired World (Chapter Six)" is featured on The Chapters Live (rec. 2003, rel. 2005) and Spin It Again! Live in Munich (rec. 2012, rel. 2013).
 "Perfectionist" can be found on Detours (rec. 1997, rel. 1999), Contact - Live in Munich (rec. 2007, rel. 2009) and Spin It Again! Live in Munich (rec. 2012, rel. 2013).
 "Ice Nice" is on Detours (rec. 1997, rel. 1999), Worlds Apart Revisited (rec. 2005, rel. 2007) and Live in Hamburg (rec. 2015, rel. 2016).
 "Will It Be You? (Chapter Four)" is featured on The Chapters Live (rec. 2003, rel. 2005).
 "Give 'em the Money" appears on Worlds Apart Revisited (rec. 2005, rel. 2007).
All the songs from the album except "Climbing the Ladder", which has never been played live to date, are available in official live versions.

Other information
"Humble Stance" is one of only a few songs on which Michael Sadler plays bass guitar, while Jim Crichton plays keyboards. As it is a regular part of the live setlist - unlike "It's Time" or "No Stranger", which also feature the same configuration - fans usually know the band is about to play "Humble Stance" as soon as Sadler assumes the bass guitar.

The album cover introduced the trademark alien insect, a figure that plays a prominent role in the "Chapters" storyline.  The creature is sometimes called 'Golden Warrior', 'GoldenBoy' or 'Harold, the Locust'. While only the first three albums featured this creature on the cover, it was later revived for Full Circle (1999), an album that also revived the "Chapters" story.  At that point the figure assumed the role of Saga's mascot and has since appeared on numerous releases. It can also be seen as a stage backdrop, as seen on the current DVD Spin It Again! Live in Munich (recorded in 2012 and released the following year). The image of the insect has changed over the years; the locust on the cover of the debut is noticeably different than that which appears on Images at Twilight (1979) and Silent Knight (1980). On Full Circle (1999) the locust sheds its old skin and it is this image that features on most following Saga releases.

The Chapters

Two of the songs, "Will It Be You? (Chapter Four)", and "Tired World (Chapter Six)", were part of a series of eight (but later sixteen) songs that Saga included within their first four albums called "The Chapters".  The songs told the story of a young Albert Einstein. These songs were later included on The Chapters Live (recorded in 2003 and released in 2005), though to date, there has been no official compilation of the chapters in their studio incarnation.

Track listing 
All credits adapted from the original release.

Personnel
Saga
 Michael Sadler – keyboards, vocals, Moog synthesizer, bass guitar
 Ian Crichton – guitars
 Peter Rochon – keyboards, vocals, Moog synthesizer, keyboard programming and orchestration
 Jim Crichton – bass guitar, synthesizer, Moog bass synthesizer
 Steve Negus – drums, percussion, Moog drum

Production
 Paul Gross – producer
 Alan Thorne – engineer, mixing
 Zoran Busic – design, concept
 Rene Zamic – illustrations 
 All songs published by Pocket Music/Cyborg Music, except "Ice Nice" published by Pocket Music.

References

External links 
 Saga - Saga (1978) album credits & releases at AllMusic
 Saga - Saga (1978) album releases & credits at Discogs

1978 debut albums
Saga (band) albums
Polydor Records albums